"Marooned" is the second episode of science fiction sitcom Red Dwarf Series III, and the fourteenth in the series run. It premiered on the British television channel BBC2 on 21 November 1989. Written by Rob Grant and Doug Naylor, and directed by Ed Bye, the story is about Lister and Rimmer being marooned together on a bleak ice planet. The episode was re-mastered, along with the rest of the first three series, in 1998.

Plot
Holly (Hattie Hayridge) discovers that Red Dwarf is on a collision course with five black holes and recommends that everyone abandon ship with what they need. While Kryten (Robert Llewellyn) and Cat (Danny John-Jules) take a Blue Midget to escape, Dave Lister (Craig Charles) and Arnold Rimmer (Chris Barrie) make their getaway in a Starbug. As Lister is made to listen to Rimmer's regaling of his military interests, their ship is struck by a meteor and crash lands on an icy planet. Lister is forced to do his best to survive until the pair can be found, making do with what food and supplies he has aboard Starbug, and talking with Rimmer, whose existence as a hologram means his life is not in danger. Rimmer does his best to help distract Lister from hunger by having them exchange stories of how they lost their virginity and learns about a side of Lister he never knew about.

To keep warm during their stories, Lister burns Rimmer's collection of books and a sizeable amount of money he saved up in life. When the fire burns low, Lister suggests using either Rimmer's collection of 19th century war figures or his camphor wood chest, to which Rimmer refuses to let them be used and recommends that Lister's guitar be burned instead. Lister reluctantly agrees and asks for a moment alone, whereupon he secretly cuts out a silhouette of his guitar from the trunk, burns it, and hides his guitar in a locker. When Rimmer returns, he commends Lister for his assumed sacrifice, noting how much their personal belongings each mean to them. Shortly afterwards, Kryten and Cat arrive, having searched for the pair for the past two days, revealing that Holly mistook grit on the ship's scanner-scope for black holes. As the group prepare to leave, Rimmer discovers Lister's deceit when he recovers his guitar, and advises Kryten to grab a hacksaw as he prepares to make him a eunuch.

Production
The Starbug crash sequence was achieved by using a miniature ice planet and filmed on 35mm film stock in order to slow the footage down. The flaming meteorite was dropped from above onto the upward facing Starbug and filmed sideways on. This gave the impression of forward motion and made the meteorite's flames that desired flicker of zero gravity. For the icy wastelands scenes with Kryten and Cat bluescreen was used, but a more realistic snowscape scene was created for Lister's blowing about scene. Soap powder was blown down the set by powerful fans.

Scenes that were cut included the crew playing strip poker at the beginning (as seen in the Smeg Outs video released later) and the Cat's 'Mush Mush!' which was trimmed down from its larger initial state. Despite popular rumours, the dog food eaten by Craig Charles in this episode was not real. It was actually tuna mixed with meat jelly to look like dog food. The episode was originally titled "Men of Honour", referring to the theme of the story of the sacrifices Rimmer and Lister had to make. The title was later changed to the shorter "Marooned".

Cultural references
Among Rimmer's possessions in his camphor wood trunk are his nineteenth century replicas of Napoleon's L'Armée du Nord. Rimmer references Lieutenant-General Baron Jaquinaux of the First Cavalry Division when Lister picks the replica up.  Lister comments that Rimmer is obsessed with war, half his books being about Patton, Caesar and "various other gits". Lister references Road Runner in describing Rimmer's cowardly act in fleeing a bar room brawl. Rimmer references Newcastle Brown bottles when stating that Generals don't resort to violence. Rimmer said to Lister that he had visited Alexander the Great's palace in Macedonia.

Among the few edible items found aboard Starbug are a Pot Noodle, half a bag of soggy smoky bacon crisps, a tin of mustard powder, three water biscuits, a brown lemon, 2 bottles of vinegar, and a tube of Bonjela gum ointment. As Lister looks through Rimmer's books they all remind him of food; Charles Lamb, Herman Wouk (whose last name Lister pronounced as "Wok"), the complete works of Sir Francis Bacon, Eric Van Lustbader (arguing that food comes in vans) and Harold Pinter (Pint-er).  As an alternative to the "Mayday" distress call, which he mistakenly believes is named for a bank holiday, Rimmer comes up with "Shrove Tuesday", "Ascension Sunday" and "The fifteenth Wednesday after Pentecost". In a continuity error in that scene, Rimmer is shown operating Starbug's distress call system, when as a hologram he should not be able to interact with the ship's controls. In another error it is not explained how Rimmer is able to smell burning camphor wood, despite being a hologram. It is also something to wonder why there would be a can of dog food on board Starbug when Red Dwarf would not allow pets, as well as the food still being in good condition after three million years. Lister references the Ryder Cup while Rimmer compares Lister's bottom to two badly parked Volkswagens.

To keep warm Lister starts burning some of Rimmer's books including Biggles' Big Adventure and the Complete Works of Shakespeare. Rimmer name-checks Shakespeare's work as Lister gets ready to burn it: "Goodbye Hamlet?  Farewell Macbeth? Toodle-pip King Lear." He states that he's seen West Side Story, which is based on one of them and loathes the idea of burning Richard III with its "unforgettable" speech that starts with "Now..." (presumably referencing the "Now is the winter of our discontent" speech), although he cannot remember anything beyond that first word. Lolita is also burned on the fire, minus one particularly racy page. The song Lister plays on his guitar is "She's out of My Life" by Michael Jackson.

Continuity Goofs
As Rimmer is a hologram, he is not supposed to have any sense of smell, taste, or touch, yet he displays at least one of each in this.  While Lister is outside looking for wood, Rimmer is shown pushing a button on the console to get help.  How can he touch the button if he is a hologram?  Secondly, Rimmer says later that he tried some gum ointment and says that it has a minty flavour.  How could he taste minty flavour as a hologram?  Rimmer also says that he found a tin of dog food in the cupboard.  How could he open the cupboard if he is a hologram?  Lastly, while Lister is burning the part of Rimmer's trunk that Rimmer thinks is Lister's guitar, Rimmer says he can smell camphor wood.  How can he smell something if he is a hologram?

Reception
The episode was originally broadcast on the British television channel BBC2 on 21 November 1989 in the 9:00pm evening time slot. In its review, DVD Talk stated that "the dialogue is witty and hilarious", and said that "there are tons of memorable lines and scenes from this episode, and is consequently a fan favorite as well." The episode came 15th in a Red Dwarf Magazine readers poll, gaining 2.4% of the votes. Chris Barrie has said that the episode is one of his all-time favorites.

Remastering

The remastering of Series I to III was carried out during the late 1990s with the intention of bringing the early production values up to a standard suitable for international television. General changes throughout the series included replacement of the opening credits, giving the picture a colour grade and filmising, computer generated special effects of Red Dwarf and many more visual and audio enhancements.

There have been changes made specific to "Marooned". During the early shuttle bay scenes a blue-screen image has been added to Starbug'''s cockpit window. Shots of Blue Midget and Starbug departing Red Dwarf have been replaced with CGI versions. References to Cliff Richard and the ozone layer have been removed.

Upon its release on VHS the new re-mastered episodes were generally received poorly by fans of the show, although it has been stated by critics that they are "actually an invigorating new take on a classic series". The re-mastered series was later released, along with other material, on The Bodysnatcher DVD boxset, in 2007.

See also
 Better Than Life The second Red Dwarf'' novel which uses some of the "Marooned" plot for part of the story.

Notes

References

External links

Series III episode guide at www.reddwarf.co.uk

Red Dwarf III episodes
1989 British television episodes